Grace Pitts, better known as Graace, is an Australian singer-songwriter from Sydney. She is best known for her vocals on Hayden James' platinum selling single "Numb". It was released in October 2017.

Career

2017–2018: Self Sabotage
Graace first come to media attention co-writing and featuring on Hayden James' "Numb", which was released in October 2017. The song was certified platinum in Australia and showcased her vocals. In 2018 Graace joined Flight Facilities as a touring vocalist on their "The Return Flight" tour, playing shows across Australia, North America, Europe and New Zealand.

In May 2018, Graace released her debut solo single "Kissing Boys". In September 2018, it was announced that Graace had signed with Sony Music Australia and released "Last Night". Her debut extended play Self Sabotage was released in October 2018 followed by a third and final single from the EP "SOS" in November 2018.

2019-present: Self Preservation 
On 17 May 2019, Graace released "Have Fun at Your Party". On 23 August 2019, Graace released "21st Century Love". On 13 December 2019, Graace released "Overthink". 

On 1 October 2021, Graace released "Sentimental", a song Graace said serves as a "letter to my past self".

In November 2021, Graace released "Half Awake" and announces her second EP Self Preservation will be released in February 2022. In an interview with Women in Pop Graace said " [It is] literally the polar opposite to [debut EP] Self Sabotage. I think my growth in those three years was pretty immense emotionally. I love this EP so much because it's not just about heartbreak, I've finally been able to write about my father and things that are really, really personal."

Discography

Extended plays

Singles

As lead artist

As featured artist

Other appearances

References

External links
 
 
 

21st-century Australian musicians
21st-century women musicians
Australian electronic musicians
Australian women pop singers
Australian women in electronic music
Living people
Musicians from Sydney
Sony Music Australia artists
Year of birth missing (living people)